Champa is a city and municipality in Janjgir-Champa district in the Indian state of Chhattisgarh.

Geography
Champa has an average elevation of 253 metres (830 feet). It is located on the banks of Hasdeo river, a tributary of Mahanadi.

Demographics

 India census, Champa had a population of approx 45000. Males constitute 51% of the population and females 49%. Champa has an average literacy rate of 65%, higher than the national average of 59.5%; with male literacy of 59% and female literacy of 41%. 14% approx of the population is under 6 years of age. The city is divided in two parts by a temple of Samleshwari Devi which is situated in the heart of the city.

Kosa
Kosa Silk of champa is famous for its purity and made by people belong to Dewangan Caste. Kosa is also exported to other countries from here.

Administration 
Champa City runs under the administration of the Municipality Of Champa.  Jai Thawait is mayor of Champa. He is from the Indian National Congress.

Economy

Champa is famous for Samleshwari Devi temple Kuldevi of champa and Kaleswar Nath Mahadev temple. Champa is also famous for its Kosa silk, gold and brass metal works. Champa has large industries viz. Madhya Bharat Paper Limited (MBPL), Prakash Industries Ltd., CSPGCL's Marwa Power Plant and many mega power projects are in under construction. Kosa silk merchant are particularly from Dewangan caste. They import Kosa (Tassar silk) yarn from China and Korea and make silk shirtings and sarees. They also make yarn from Kosa called Cocoon in English and make Khadi Shirtings.
They export it to many Indian states and countries like the U.K., U.S.A. and Brazil.
Champa is one of the producer of High Quality Silk.

Education

Colleges
 Indian Institute of Handloom Technology, Champa
 Govt. M.M.R.Post Graduate college
 The Leprosy Mission Chhattisgarh Vocational Training Centre, Champa

School

English Medium
Delhi Public School Champa
Fairy Public School [Champa]
Kidzone English School
Hasdeo Public School Champa
Lions Hr. Sec. School Champa
Rainbow Kidzee School, Champa
Prince Of Peace English High School Champa CG
Little Angle Covent School Champa

Hindi Medium
Saraswati Shishu Mandir, Champa
Saraswati Shishu Mandir Primary School (Hatri Bazar)
Amardeep Public School Champa
LDN School
Keshar Public School
Gyandeep Public School
Gyanmandir School
Gaytri Bal Sanskar High School
Manka Public School

Hospitals
B.D.M. Dharam Hospital (Government Hospital)
NKH Hospital
Nayak Nursing Home
Mission Hospital
Osho Dhara Hospital
Rathore Clinik
Vinayak Netralay
Nayak Maternity and Surgical Centre
TLM Bethesda Leprosy Home and Hospital
Bachpan Children Hospital
Dewangan Nursing Home

Transportation
Champa is a well connected city to Bigger cities whether by road or by Railways. It is easy to reach champa.

Roadways
Champa is well connected through roads to state capital Raipur which is 161.4 km away via NH130B and it is connected to Delhi, the country's capital, via NH44.

Railways
Champa railway station is a junction on the Tatanagar–Bilaspur section of Howrah-Nagpur-Mumbai line. Korba (Gevra) passengers need to change line from here for going to Korba. It is the biggest railway station in the Janjgir-Champa District of Chhattisgarh. It is one of the 'A' graded stations of the country.

Air
Nearest commercial airport is Swami Vivekananda Airport, Naya Raipur (178 km away).

Tourist places

Hanuman Dhara
Hanuman Dhara is picnic spot located at northwest city (Side of Hasdeo River). This place is surrounded by dense trees. Name of the spot is for Hanuman Temple, situated in this place.

Kera Jhariya
It is a tourist place located beside Bank of Hasdev River. According to a historical myth, a monk lived at this place who was capable of crossing the river by walking.

Madwarani Temple
(17 km away from city)
Its goddess durga temple situated at Champa Korba road.

Sambleshwari Temple

Rambandha Lake

Vivekanand Garden great

Raj Mahal

Entertainment
Champa has two multiplex cinema halls
 Mukund Multiplex
 Padmini Cineplex

References

See also
 Janjgir-Champa District

Cities and towns in Janjgir-Champa district
Bilaspur railway division